Somerville is an eastern suburb of the city of Auckland, New Zealand. Most of the houses were built in the 1990s. Before 1990, the area was rural.

A large area of land was bought by Archibald Somerville in 1863, and his descendents farmed it until subdivision in 1988. Development of residential housing was well under way in 1996.

Demographics

Somerville had a population of 4,473 at the 2018 New Zealand census, an increase of 144 people (3.3%) since the 2013 census, and a decrease of 63 people (−1.4%) since the 2006 census. There were 1,392 households, comprising 2,193 males and 2,280 females, giving a sex ratio of 0.96 males per female. The median age was 41.5 years (compared with 37.4 years nationally), with 795 people (17.8%) aged under 15 years, 810 (18.1%) aged 15 to 29, 2,133 (47.7%) aged 30 to 64, and 729 (16.3%) aged 65 or older.

Ethnicities were 47.1% European/Pākehā, 3.5% Māori, 2.4% Pacific peoples, 49.3% Asian, and 2.7% other ethnicities. People may identify with more than one ethnicity.

The percentage of people born overseas was 56.5, compared with 27.1% nationally.

Although some people chose not to answer the census's question about religious affiliation, 49.8% had no religion, 34.5% were Christian, 3.7% were Hindu, 1.4% were Muslim, 4.2% were Buddhist and 1.9% had other religions.

Of those at least 15 years old, 1,170 (31.8%) people had a bachelor's or higher degree, and 423 (11.5%) people had no formal qualifications. The median income was $32,400, compared with $31,800 nationally. 789 people (21.5%) earned over $70,000 compared to 17.2% nationally. The employment status of those at least 15 was that 1,728 (47.0%) people were employed full-time, 477 (13.0%) were part-time, and 138 (3.8%) were unemployed.

Education
It opened in 1974.

The school opened in 1997.

Both schools are coeducational. Rolls are as of

References

Suburbs of Auckland
Howick Local Board Area